Deer is an unincorporated community in Osage County, in the U.S. state of Missouri.

History
A post office called Deer was established in 1901, and remained in operation until 1932. The community most likely was so named on account of deer in the area.

References

Unincorporated communities in Osage County, Missouri
Unincorporated communities in Missouri
Jefferson City metropolitan area